The  was an incident that took place in Japan in April 14, 1988 in Tokyo's Toshima Ward. Covered extensively by both Japanese and international media, it was also the basis of the 2004 drama film Nobody Knows.  

The incident involved a mother who abandoned her five underage children whose names were never released, but referred to simply as Children A, B, C, D, and E.

Background
Child A, a boy, was born in 1973; Child B in 1981. Child C died soon after birth in 1984. Children D and E were born in 1985 and 1986 respectively. All of the children had different fathers. Although it is unclear, it appears that besides Child A, several (perhaps all) of the other children were unregistered. None of the children attended school. In Autumn 1987, having met a new boyfriend, the mother placed Child A in charge of the others, leaving him with ¥50,000 (around US$350 at the time) for their living expenses in their Tokyo apartment.

Discovery
On April 14, 1988, the youngest, Child E, was assaulted by friends of Child A (known only as Friend A and Friend B), and died as a result. On July 17 of the same year, acting on a tip from the landlord, Sugamo officials entered the apartment and discovered the severely malnourished Child A (then 14), Child B (seven), and Child D (three). They also found the body of Child C, but not Child E.  The information given by the children was vague. It was determined that the malnourishment was caused in part by the children's diet, which consisted largely of food bought at convenience stores.

As a result of news coverage of the incident, the mother turned herself in on July 23. Her testimony revealed that the children had been alone for about nine months and that the whereabouts of Child E were unknown. On July 25, Child A's testimony revealed that Child E had been killed by Friend B of Child A, and that her body had been buried in a wood in Chichibu by Child A and Friend A. Friend A and Friend B were sent to a reform school for their involvement in the death.  

In August 1988, the mother was indicted for child abandonment. She received a three-year sentence, suspended for four years. Although Child A was probably not present at the time of his sister's death, he did assist Friend A in burying the body; he was indicted for abandoning a body, but in consideration of the circumstances was remanded to a care facility. After the mother's three-year sentence, she regained custody of the two daughters.

Film adaptation
The 2004 film Nobody Knows, directed by Hirokazu Koreeda, presents a fictionalized account of the incident with various details altered.

See also

 Rie Fujii
 Osaka child abandonment case
 Coin-operated-locker babies

References

Further reading
少年事件を考える｜「女・子供」の視点から Asahi Shimbun, 1989

External links
Mother regains custody of two abandoned daughters after jail time 

Child abuse resulting in death
Child abandonment
1988 crimes in Japan
Incidents of violence against boys